PSDS or Persatuan Sepakbola Deli Serdang is an Indonesian football team based in Deli Serdang, North Sumatra. They currently compete in Liga 2 and their homebase is Baharuddin Siregar Stadium.

Players

Current squad

Coaching Staff

Naturalized players

Honours
 Perserikatan First Division
 Champion (1): 1986–87
 Liga Indonesia First Division
 Runner-up (1): 2004
 Liga 3 North Sumatra
 Champions (3): 2017, 2018, 2021
 Soeratin Cup
 Winner (1): 2012

References

External links

Football clubs in Indonesia
Football clubs in North Sumatra
1956 establishments in Indonesia
Association football clubs established in 1956